Oplonaeschna is a genus of riffle darners in the dragonfly family Aeshnidae. There are about five described species in Oplonaeschna.

Species
These five species belong to the genus Oplonaeschna:
 Oplonaeschna armata (Hagen, 1861) (riffle darner)
 Oplonaeschna magna González & Novelo, 1998
 † Oplonaeschna lapidaria Cockerell & Counts
 † Aeschna metis (Heer, 1849)
 † Oplonaeschna staurophlebioides Henriksen, 1922

References

Further reading

 
 
 
 

Aeshnidae
Articles created by Qbugbot